Kolekanos plumicauda is a species of African gecko found in Angola.

References

Endemic fauna of Angola
Kolekanos